Shkëlzen Maliqi (born 26 October 1947) is a Kosovar philosopher, art critic, political analyst and intellectual. During the early 1990s, Shkelzen was also directly involved in politics. He was one of the founders of the Social Democratic Party of Kosovo and served as its first president from 1991 to 1993. He also held leading positions in civil society organisations such as the Kosovo Civil Society Foundation (1995–2000) and the Kosovo Helsinki Committee (1990–1997).

Maliqi has published several books on art and politics in Albanian, English, Italian, Spanish, and Serbian. From the beginning of the 1980s, he has been a regular contributor to the most important media outlets in Kosovo and the former Yugoslavia. Maliqi lives in Pristina and heads the "Gani Bobi" Institute for Social Studies.

See also
 Gani Bobi
 Muhamedin Kullashi
 Fatos Lubonja

References

External links 
 Gani Bobi Official Website
 Shkelzen Maliqi's essay on "Beyond the New Art of Kosovo" published in Ulemec
  Maliqi's interview in German "Keine linke Option"
 Interview with Shkelzen Maliqi - "A Fictitious Bridge"
 Maliqi - "The future of Kosovo"
 Interview for Radio Free Europe (in Albanian)
 "Shkelzen Maliqi" query on "Amazon"
 "Shkelzen Maliqi" query  on "Google Books"
 "Shkelzen Maliqi" query  on "Google Scholar"

20th-century Albanian philosophers
21st-century Albanian philosophers
Living people
1947 births
Kosovo Albanians
People from Orahovac
Albanian art critics
20th-century Albanian politicians
Kosovan journalists
Albanian-language writers
Kosovan activists
Albanian male writers
Kosovan writers
Yugoslav people of Albanian descent
Kosovan essayists
Albanian essayists
20th-century essayists
21st-century essayists
20th-century male writers
21st-century male writers
Albanian–Serbian translators